Oakley Chester Curtis (March 29, 1865 – February 22, 1924) was an American politician and the 50th Governor of Maine.

Early life 
Curtis was born in Portland, Maine on March 29, 1865. He studied at the local schools. He worked in the banking industry. He served as president of the Casco Mercantile Trust Company and as the director of the United States Trust Company and the Merchants Trust Company.

Politics 
Curtis became alderman of Portland in 1901 and served for one term. He became a member of the Maine House of Representatives in 1903. He held that position until 1904. He became a member of the Maine State Senate in 1905, and held that position until 1908. He then served as the mayor of Portland from 1911–1914.

Governor of Maine 
Curtis was nominated for the governorship of Maine by the Democratic Party in 1914. He won the general election by a popular vote. He held the governor's office from January 6, 1915 to January 3, 1917. During his administration, the labor laws for women and children were improved and the Komoos Sieur de Montes National Monument was established. Curtis was unsuccessful in his re-election bid.

Personal life 
Curtis married Edith L. Hamilton and they had five children. He was a Congregationalist.

Sources 
 Sobel, Robert and John Raimo. Biographical Directory of the Governors of the United States, 1789–1978. Greenwood Press, 1988. 

1865 births
1924 deaths
American Congregationalists
Democratic Party governors of Maine
Politicians from Portland, Maine
Mayors of Portland, Maine